St. Marys Point or Saint Marys Point is a city in Washington County, Minnesota, United States. The population was 368 at the 2010 census.

Geography
County 18 serves as a main route.

Demographics

2010 census
As of the census of 2010, there were 368 people, 149 households, and 104 families living in the city. The racial makeup of the city was 98.6% White, 0.3% Native American, 0.5% Asian, and 0.5% from two or more races. Hispanic or Latino of any race were 0.3% of the population.

There were 149 households, of which 28.2% had children under the age of 18 living with them, 56.4% were married couples living together, 8.7% had a female householder with no spouse present, 4.7% had a male householder with no spouse present, and 30.2% were non-families. 22.1% of all households were made up of individuals, and 6% had someone living alone who was 65 years of age or older. The average household size was 2.47 and the average family size was 2.88.

The median age in the city was 46.1 years. 23.1% of residents were under the age of 18; 5.5% were between the ages of 18 and 24; 18.7% were from 25 to 44; 40.5% were from 45 to 64; and 12.2% were 65 years of age or older. The gender makeup of the city was 50.8% male and 49.2% female.

2000 census
As of the census of 2000, there were 344 people, 132 households, and 95 families living in the city. The racial makeup of the city was 97.67% White, 0.29% from other races, and 2.03% from two or more races. Hispanic or Latino of any race were 0.29% of the population.

There were 132 households, out of which 34.1% had children under the age of 18 living with them, 57.6% were married couples living together, 10.6% had a female householder with no husband present, and 28.0% were non-families. 22.7% of all households were made up of individuals, and 7.6% had someone living alone who was 65 years of age or older.  The average household size was 2.61 and the average family size was 3.11.

In the city, the population was spread out, with 28.2% under the age of 18, 4.4% from 18 to 24, 27.9% from 25 to 44, 27.6% from 45 to 64, and 11.9% who were 65 years of age or older.  The median age was 40 years. For every 100 females, there were 84.0 males.  For every 100 females age 18 and over, there were 91.5 males.

The median income for a household in the city was $61,750, and the median income for a family was $75,441. Males had a median income of $41,875 versus $37,188 for females. The per capita income for the city was $36,905.  About 2.9% of families and 5.8% of the population were below the poverty line, including 12.1% of those under age 18 and none of those age 65 or over.

Notable people
Karin Housley, Republican member of the Minnesota Senate
Phil Housley, former NHL player and member of the Hockey Hall of Fame
Stanley S. Hubbard, billionaire heir and CEO of Hubbard Broadcasting

References

External links
 Washington County Historical Society – St. Mary's Point, MN

 http://stmaryspointmn.govoffice3.com/http://stmaryspointmn.govoffice3.com

Cities in Washington County, Minnesota
Cities in Minnesota